"G.D.F.R." (abbreviation for Goin' Down for Real) is a song by American rapper Flo Rida featuring American rapper Sage the Gemini, American music producer and DJ Lookas and DJ Frank E from Flo Rida's 2015 EP My House. It was released as the album's lead single on October 21, 2014, in the United States. The song was written by Flo Rida, Sage the Gemini and P-Lo and produced by DJ Frank E and Andrew Cedar, with co-production from Lookas and Miles Beard.

The song was a sleeper hit, peaking at number eight on the Billboard Hot 100 in April 2015, making it Flo Rida's tenth top ten single on the chart, selling over one million copies domestically. Outside of the United States, "G.D.F.R." peaked within the top ten of the charts in nine countries, including Denmark, Germany, Norway, and the United Kingdom.

Composition
The song uses instrumental samples from Lookas' remix of "Low Rider" by War, namely in its hook. Some listeners incorrectly believe that the song is played with an oboe, however, the song is played with a saxophone by Clay Pritchard. Flo Rida has stated that he shortened the title to G.D.F.R. to remind the listener of graffiti. According to musicnotes.com, the song is written in G minor, with a tempo of 146 beats per minute.

Music video
The official music video was released on December 24, 2014. The set revolves around Flo Rida as a basketball coach with professional dancers who double as basketball players (Team Strong Arm vs. Team Mad Dog). Team Strong Arm comes back in the end and wins by 3 points. Miami Heat power forward Udonis Haslem, Natalie La Rose, and Gorilla Zoe makes an appearance. During parts of the video the on screen score displays the incorrect initials G.F.D.R.

Rap group 2 Live Crew (Brother Marquis and Fresh Kid Ice) also make a cameo.

Charts

Weekly charts

Year-end charts

Certifications

References

External links
Full Lyrics at LyricsOnDemand.com 

2014 singles
2014 songs
Flo Rida songs
Sage the Gemini songs
Atlantic Records singles
Songs written by Flo Rida
Songs written by Mike Caren
Songs written by DJ Frank E
Songs written by Sage the Gemini